Stealing home most commonly refers to:

Stolen base, a type of play in the game of baseball

Stealing Home or Stealin' Home may also refer to:

Stealin' Home (album), a 1978 album release by Ian Matthews
Stealin' Home a 2002 album by Bob Snider
Stealing Home, a 1988 movie starring Mark Harmon and Jodie Foster
Stealing Home (2001 film), a 2001 documentary about Cuban baseball defectors
"Stealing Home" (Cold Case episode), a season 6 episode of Cold Case
"Stealing Home" (CSI: NY episode), a season 2 episode of CSI: NY
"Stealing Home" (White Collar episode), a season 3 episode of White Collar